A number of steamships have been named SS Illinois, including:

Ship names